Dan Hennessey (born August 25) is a Canadian voice director and voice actor who, early on in his career, performed with a children's comedy troupe The Zoo Factory (with John Stocker, Bruce Gordon, Harriet Cohen, and Jerelyn Homer). That same year, in 1973, he played Claudius, King of Denmark in his first film, a Canadian adaptation of Shakespeare's Hamlet play.

A decade later, he was the voice of Chief Quimby and other characters on DiC's Inspector Gadget and starred as Dizzy in Nelvana's first feature film, Rock & Rule.

His best-known role is the voice of Brave Heart Lion in the animated Care Bears franchise (he also voiced Loyal Heart Dog).

Career
During the 1980s, 1990s, and 2000s, Hennessey had many voice roles to his credit, appearing both in animation and live-action, in films, series, and specials. During this time, Dan also worked as a voice director in the same areas.

From 1995–2003, Hennessey voiced the titular character's father on Nick Jr.'s Little Bear.

He also voiced the characters Thompson and Thomson alongside John Stocker in the TV episodes of the comic series The Adventures of Tintin.

Notable credits

Voice work
Jayce and the Wheeled Warriors - Audric/Sawtrooper/KO Cruiser (voice)
My Pet Monster - Beastur (voice)
Dinosaucers - Genghis Rex/Plesio/Major Clifton (voice)
Police Academy - Zed McGlunk/Eugene Tackleberry (voice)
ALF: The Animated Series - Sloop/Eggbert Petty (voice)
ALF Tales - Sloop/Eggbert Petty (voice)
The Raccoons - George Raccoon/Train Engineer Sid/Sidekick (voice)
The Adventures of Super Mario Bros. 3 - Bully Koopa (voice) and additional voices
Super Mario World - Bully Koopa (voice) and additional voices
Babar - Chef Truffles (voice)
Rock & Rule - Dizzy (voice)
The Care Bears (both the DiC and Nelvana versions) - Brave Heart Lion/Good Luck Bear (voice)
Four Care Bears movies
The Care Bears Movie - Brave Heart Lion
Care Bears Movie II: A New Generation - Brave Heart Lion
The Care Bears Adventure in Wonderland - Brave Heart Lion
Care Bears Nutcracker Suite - Brave Heart Lion
Free Willy
Highlander: The Animated Series
Beetlejuice - Cap'n Kidder/Bully the Crud (voice)
Totally Spies! - Guest Star (in the episode "Super Agent Much?")
Hello Kitty and Friends
Two Madballs film specials
RoboCop - Dr. McNamara (voice)
Space Strikers
Bill and Ted's Excellent Adventures
Tales from the Cryptkeeper
Piggsburg Pigs! - Police officer (voice, in the episode "Carnival of Evil")
Bad Dog
Bob and Margaret
Ace Ventura: Pet Detective - Patsy the Gorilla/Lars the Gorilla/Police Officer/Skinny Henchman/Santa Claus/Larry Astavore/Alligator (voice)
The Magic School Bus
Inspector Gadget - Chief Quimby/M.A.D. Agent/Various (voice)
Popples
Cyberchase - MC (voice, in "A Time to Cook".)
Roboroach
Time Warp Trio
Silver Surfer
Donkey Kong Country
Hammerman
Dog City - Baron Von Rottweiler/Meat the Butcher/Large Cat/Bouvier DeFlaundra (voice)
Anatole
The Adventures of Sam & Max: Freelance Police - The Commissioner (voice)
Flying Rhino Junior High
Storm Hawks
Ned's Newt
Cadillacs and Dinosaurs
Grossology
Odd Job Jack
Ultraforce - General (voice, in the "Prime Time" episode)
The Rosey and Buddy Show
The Dumb Bunnies
Medabots
C.O.P.S. - Turbo Tu-Tone (voice)
The Neverending Story - South Wind Giant (voice)
X-Men - Ruckus (voice)
Monster by Mistake
Avengers: United They Stand
Garbage Pail Kids
Rupert
Birdz
Wayside
Committed
The Get Along Gang (the early version) - Catchum Crocodile (voice)
The Incredible Crash Dummies
Star Wars: Ewoks - King Gorneesh/Trome 1 (voice)
Star Wars: Droids - Governor Koong/Jyn Obah/Various (voice)
The Busy World of Richard Scarry
Starcom - Maj. Klag (SHADO Starmada) (voice)
WildC.A.T.S.
Atomic Betty
Mythic Warriors: Guardians of the Legend - Titan/Other Slaves/Bald Headed Hunter/Young Hero/Physician/Nessus/Soldier #3/Rebel #2/Royal Advisor (voice)
King of Kensington
Freaky Stories
Corduroy
Jacob Two-Two
Mischief City
Little Rosey
The Berenstain Bears - Mr. Kodak/Sneezing Bear
Delta State
Braceface
Angela Anaconda
Franklin - ???? (voice)
Flash Gordon
Little Shop - ???? (voice)
Rescue Heroes - British Oil Truck Driver (voice, heard in "Mayhem in the Mist")
Willa's Wild Life - ???? (voice)
The Great Heep (a Star Wars animated special) - Jord Dusat (ep4), Uncle Gundy, Jyn Obah, Vinga, Yorpa and Governor Koong (voice)
Monster Force - ???? (voice)
Beverly Hills Teens - ???? (voice)
The New Archies - ???? (voice)
Anne of Green Gables: The Animated Series - ???? (voice)
Carl Squared - ???? (voice)
Blaster's Universe - ???? (voice)
Peep and the Big Wide World - ???? (voice)
Super Why! - ???? (voice)
Wilbur - ???? (voice)
The Future Is Wild - ???? (voice)
Keroppi - ???? (voice)
Diabolik - ???? (voice)
The Adventures of Tintin - Thomson (voice)
Blazing Dragons - Sir Hotbreath/Evil Knight No. 3 (voice)
Redwall - Ragear (voice)
Little Bear - Father Bear (voice)

Voice direction
X-Men
Beetlejuice
Ace Ventura: Pet Detective
Birdz
Starcom
Blazing Dragons
Blaster's Universe
WildC.A.T.S.
Stickin' Around
Rescue Heroes
Elliot Moose
The Care Bears
Mythic Warriors: Guardians of the Legend
Cyberchase
Seven Little Monsters
Little Bear
The Little Bear Movie
Knights of Zodiac (the English version)
Power Stone
Slam Dunk
Interlude
Ultraforce
Committed
Best Ed
The Magic School Bus
Pelswick
Quads!
Air Master

References

John Stocker Biography by L. Mangue, Nerf-Herders-Anonymous.net  .

External links

Living people
Canadian voice directors
Canadian male video game actors
Canadian male voice actors
20th-century Canadian male actors
21st-century Canadian male actors
Canadian people of Irish descent
Year of birth missing (living people)